Dimitrios Parliaros (1920 – unknown) was a Greek chess player. He won the Greek Chess Championship two times (1950, 1954).

Biography
In the 1950s Dimitrios Parliaros was a leading Greek chess player. He won the Greek Chess Championships two-times: 1950 and 1954.

Dimitrios Parliaros played for Greece in the Chess Olympiad:
 In 1954, at first board in the 11th Chess Olympiad in Amsterdam (+0, =6, -12).

References

External links

Dimitrios Parliaros chess games at 365chess.com

1920 births
Year of death missing
Greek chess players
Chess Olympiad competitors
20th-century Greek people